The International Federation of Petroleum and Chemical Workers (IFPCW) was a global union federation bringing together trade union representing workers in the chemical and oil industries.

History
The secretariat was established in 1954 at a meeting in Paris, held on the initiative of the International Confederation of Free Trade Unions (ICFTU) and the Oil Workers' International Union of the United States.  It was formed in response to the growth of employment in the oil industry, and was initially named the International Federation of Petroleum Workers.  Most of its founder members had previously been affiliated to the International Federation of Industrial Organisations and General Workers' Unions (IFF).

The secretariat was based in Denver, and was the only global union federation to have headquarters outside Europe.  By 1960, it had 43 affiliates, with a membership of more than 500,000.  In 1963, the union began recruiting unions of chemical workers, and renamed itself as the "International Federation of Petroleum and Chemical Workers".  This brought it into conflict with the IFF, which renamed itself as the "International Federation of Chemical and General Workers' Unions" (ICF), and the ICFTU suspended grants to both organisations.

By the late 1960s, it became known that the IFPCW was receiving regular grants from CIA funds, and it became regarded as a CIA front organisation.  Faced with a loss of prestige, it discussed a potential merger with the ICF, but this did not occur, and it dissolved in 1976.

Affiliates
In 1960, the following unions were affiliated to the federation:

Leadership

General Secretaries
1954: Loyd A. Haskins
1973: Curtis Hogan

Presidents
1954: Jack Knight
1967: Luis Tovar
1973: George Sacre

References

Chemical industry trade unions
Global union federations
Trade unions established in 1954
Trade unions disestablished in 1976